Shepaug Valley School (SVS) is a seven-year (grades 6-12) public, coeducational middle and high school in Washington, Connecticut. Shepaug Valley School is the only public secondary school of Regional School District 12, which serves Washington, Bridgewater, and Roxbury.

It was formerly two separate schools, Shepaug Valley Middle School (SVMS) and Shepaug Valley High School (SVHS). It was chosen as Connecticut's only public high school to receive the blue-ribbon school in 1998, and one of two in New England.

History

Prior to 2000 the school received block scheduling. In 2012 the superintendent of the school district, Patricia Cosentino, wanted to establish a "flexible schedule" (using elements of both block and traditional scheduling) regime for both the middle and high schools, and therefore end block scheduling for high school students. The high school parent council opposed the plan. In 2012 there were about 320 students in the high school, and the enrollment was decreasing. 10 years later in 2022, there has been a continued decline in the amount of attendees at the institution, with a total enrollment of 434 students across grades 6-12.

Ground plan
Shepaug is a one-floor building housed on an  campus. Since the space is shared with students of Shepaug Valley Middle School, who have their own wing in the building, high school students take academic courses in their own section of the building, a long hallway off of which classrooms branch.

The rest of the building is shared between middle and high school students. It consists of a cafeteria, a large, central cavity known as "the mall", a library resource center with more than 10,000 print volumes, gymnasium, planetarium, swimming pool, band and choir practice rooms, fine arts, auto, and woodworking shops, and a professionally equipped theatre.

Outdoors on campus, there is a peace pole and reflection area, a swing-set, a pond, and a memorial to former student Tam Farrow. Shepaug also hosts soccer and field hockey fields, a competitive cross country trail, and a track that was recently under renovation.

Notable alumni
 Stephen C. Reich,  United States Army Major killed during Operation Red Wings
 Evan Scribner, former MLB player (San Diego Padres, Oakland Athletics)
 Joe Moravsky, athlete and reality television contestant
 Sadie Dupuis, lead vocals and guitar in band Speedy Ortiz

References

External links
 

Schools in Litchfield County, Connecticut
Public high schools in Connecticut
Public middle schools in Connecticut
1969 establishments in Connecticut